Geneva Township is in Kane County, Illinois.  As of the 2010 census, its population was 26,552 and it contained 10,210 housing units.

Geography
Unlike the prototypical Midwestern township, which is a six mile by six mile square, Geneva Township splits such a  square with Batavia Township. It is divided by the Fox River.

Cities, Towns, Villages
Batavia (northern segment)
Geneva (vast majority)

Demographics

References
 

Townships in Kane County, Illinois
Townships in Illinois